George Hall Esq. was a British administrator in the 19th century.

South Australia
George Hall Esq. was Private Secretary to the Governor of South Australia George Gawler and Clerk of the Legislative Council in 1840, including a period acting as Colonial Secretary of South Australia while Robert Gouger was unwell. He was Clerk of the Council from 18 October 1838 through to 1840.

Parkhurst Prison
After his time in South Australia, Hall was governor of Parkhurst Prison on the Isle of Wight. In his time as Governor of Parkhurst Prison, Hall proposed sending boys who were convicted in Britain to colonies as Parkhurst apprentices, whereupon they would receive a pardon on arrival in a colony, but be expected to serve out an apprenticeship before being eligible to return to Britain. This proposal was rejected by the Colony of South Australia, but accepted in Swan River Colony and forced on the Colony of New Zealand. Hall was an early advocate of using juvenile prison to rehabilitate young offenders to society rather than teaching them to be better criminals in their adult life. He sought to teach them a trade or other skills to avoid a life of crime.

Personal life
Hall married Julia, eldest daughter of Col George Gawler on 21 September 1847 at St. John's, Derby.

Legacy
From his time in South Australia, two minor geographic features were named after him. Edward John Eyre named Mount Hall  on Eyre Peninsula after him and his boss (and future father-in-law) George Gawler named Hall's Bay (now Hall Bay) after him.

References

|-

Public servants of South Australia